Przyborzyce  is a village in the administrative district of Gmina Bytów, within Bytów County, Pomeranian Voivodeship, in northern Poland.

The village has a population of 28.

References

Przyborzyce